Come Back to Sorrento may refer to:

 Come Back to Sorrento (novel), a novel by Dawn Powell
 Come Back to Sorrento (film), a 1945 Italian musical comedy film
 "Torna a Surriento", a 1902 Neapolitan song, with English language lyrics it's titled "Come Back to Sorrento"